In photography, manual focus override, also known as full-time manual focus, allows manual intervention in the autofocus acquisition process simply by turning the focus ring on a photographic lens.

There are a number of technologies used to implement this feature. Pentax uses the trademark Quick Shift to refer to its implementations of manual focus override.

Photography equipment